Charters School is a secondary school and sixth form with academy status located in Sunningdale, Berkshire.

In December 2006 and December 2009 it was graded 1 outstanding by OFSTED.

History
Charters School opened its doors on 23 April 1958 to just under 400 students. A service of dedication was held in the school hall on 17 December 1958 and the students were given an extra half-day's holiday to mark the occasion.

The origins of the school badge came from the opening day of the school. The school opened on St. George's Day and Shakespeare's birthday. The red cross of the school badge comes from the cross of St. George, the dagger symbolises Shakespeare and the stag is the symbol of Berkshire. The badge itself was to reflect courtesy, compassion, chivalry and scholarship.

Queen Elizabeth made an informal visit to Charters School on 4 April 1962. During her visit, the Queen saw diverse lessons, from recorder playing to hammer forging, from a comptometer-operating class to woodwork and metalwork. A boys’ handicraft class was also on the agenda.

Timeline

By 1965 the population of Bracknell, Windsor and Ascot was rapidly increasing. This spurred a decision to develop Charters into an eight form entry comprehensive school taking all children from the area from the age of 11-18. By 1969, plans were under way for proposed extensions to cope with the increase in school numbers.

1972 saw extensive alterations to the school with the addition of 10 science laboratories, a games hall, drama hall and arts, crafts and home economics centres being built. By 1977, the school had become over-crowded to the extent that nine classes were regularly being taught in corridors.

In 1981 a decision was made to make Charters School a centre for physically disabled students. The school undertook a series of modifications, which included two lifts, a medical room, and home base for students as well as access ramps around the school. The school opened its doors to its first physically disabled students in September 1983.

In 1985 the sports facilities were expanded to make Charters School the focus of the area's recreational, social and community activities. The school continued to grow and in September 1992 a new purpose-built Library and Resource Centre was opened. More modular classrooms were also added.

In July 1997 Charters received the ‘School Curriculum Award’, awarded by the Princess Royal, and the Sportsmark Award.

Notable former pupils
 Duncan Capps, senior British Army officer
 Chesney Hawkes, singer, songwriter and occasional actor
 Keith Hawkins, poker player
 Sophie Christiansen, Paralympic equestrian gold medalist

External links

Secondary schools in the Royal Borough of Windsor and Maidenhead
Educational institutions established in 1958
1958 establishments in England
Academies in the Royal Borough of Windsor and Maidenhead
Sunninghill and Ascot